Atkinsons Building, which includes 2 and 4 Burlington Gardens, is a Grade II listed building on the corner of Old Bond Street and Burlington Gardens. It was built in 1926 in the Gothic Revival style and includes Arts and Crafts detailing.

The architect was Vincent Harris (1876–1971). The building was designed for the perfume company Atkinsons of London. It is currently occupied by a women's fashion store.

The building contains a carillon musical instrument.

Gallery

See also
 List of carillons of the British Isles

References

External links

Grade II listed buildings in the City of Westminster
1926 in London
Buildings by Vincent Harris
Buildings and structures in Mayfair